Major-General Harold de Riemer Morgan DSO (12 March 18881 June 1964) was a British Army officer who served as colonel of the Royal Northumberland Fusiliers.

Military career
Morgan was commissioned into the British Army on 20 August 1908. He served in the First World War as commanding officer of a battalion in which capacity he stubbornly maintained positions for which he was awarded the Distinguished Service Order in September 1918. The citation for the medal reads:

He became commanding officer of the 2nd Battalion Royal Northumberland Fusiliers in 1936.

He served in the Second World War becoming commander of the 148th Infantry Brigade, part of the 49th (West Riding) Infantry Division, in February 1940: the brigade took part in the Norwegian campaign where one battalion was deployed to Narvik and the other two battalions formed part of 'Sickleforce', a formation which took part in the Åndalsnes landings, suffered heavy losses and had to be withdrawn in early May 1940. He became General Officer Commanding 45th Infantry Division in May 1941 and then retired at the end of the War. He was appointed colonel of the Northumberland Fusiliers on 1 January 1947.

References

Bibliography

External links
Generals of World War II

 

|-

 

1888 births
1964 deaths
British Army personnel of World War I
British Army generals of World War II
Companions of the Distinguished Service Order
People educated at Harrow School
Buffs (Royal East Kent Regiment) officers
Royal Northumberland Fusiliers officers
Deputy Lieutenants of Brecknockshire
British Army major generals